Augustinus Triumphus (1243 – 2 April 1328), also known as Augustinus of Ancona, was a Hermit of St. Augustine and writer. He is celebrated for his work Summa de potestate ecclesiastica, printed in 1473. The Summa became a standard reference for papalist arguments in the later 16th century, and was several times reprinted.

Alongside James of Viterbo, Giles of Rome, and Alvarus Pelagius, Augustinus was among the leading pro-papal jurists. His title Triumphus is first attested in the 16th century.

Works 
 Summa de potestate ecclesiastica. Arnold ter Hoernen, Cologne 26.I.1475 digital

References

External links
 Page by Ugo Mariani (Italian language), context and minor works
 


1243 births
1328 deaths
13th-century Italian Roman Catholic theologians
Triumphus, Augustinus
Canonical Augustinian theologians
13th-century Latin writers
14th-century Italian Roman Catholic theologians